In the programming language Lisp, the reader or read function is the parser which converts the textual form of  Lisp objects to the corresponding internal object structure.

In the original Lisp, S-expressions consisted only of  symbols, integers, and the list constructors ( xi... ) and (x . y). Later Lisps, culminating in Common Lisp, added literals for floating-point, complex, and rational  numbers, strings, and constructors for vectors.

The reader is responsible for parsing list structure, interning symbols, converting numbers to internal form, and calling read macros.

Read table

The reader is controlled by the readtable, which defines the meaning of each character.

Read macros

Unlike most programming languages, Lisp supports parse-time execution of programs, called "read macros" or "reader macros".  These are used to extend the syntax either in universal or program-specific ways.  For example, the quoted form  (quote x) operator can be abbreviated as x.  The ' operator can be defined as a read macro which reads the following list and wraps it with quote. Similarly, the backquote operator (` ) can be defined as a read macro.

References

Bibliography
 John McCarthy et al., LISP 1.5 Programmer's Manual, MIT Press, 1962.
 David A. Moon, MACLISP Reference Manual, 1974.
 Guy Steele, Common LISP: The Language, Second Edition, 1990.

Lisp (programming language)
Parsing